The Untamed Youth were a mid-1980s garage rock band from Columbia, Missouri, United States, led by Deke Dickerson, who is best known as the frontman for Deke Dickerson & the Eccofonics. Original members (1986) were Deke Dickerson, Steve Mace, Doug Walker and Joel Trueblood (Alcohol Funnycar, Neko Case). The Untamed Youth first performed in Columbia at local club The Blue Note in January 1987, and quickly started playing locations throughout the United States between the years 1988–1993. The group disbanded in August 1993, but later reformed for a European tour in 1996 and to record two studio albums for both the Estrus and Norton labels in 1997 and 1998 respectively. The Youth were primarily a '60s-styled surf/frat rock band known for their wild stage antics such as spraying the audience with cans of beer and for their self-deprecating sense of humor (most notably to be found on their last album for Norton, 'Youth Runs Wild'). All this, while holding a true reverence for their influences… ”the gods whose grooves they hammer home are the stars on a hundred forgotten 45's, their sacred texts "Surfin' Hearse" and "Go Go Ferrari." They're best live, but their Nineties LPs "Some Kinda Fun" and "More Gone Gassers" (Norton) surge with power; do not run other appliances when playing these in your home”.  While their live shows were generally hard-edged, their albums are notably well-produced and arranged particularly their early Norton work, which was produced by Billy Miller of Norton Records and Andy Shernoff of The Dictators. These early Norton albums “capture(d) the supercharged atmosphere created whenever the Untamed Youth filled a teen club or tavern”.  Despite considerable local success and strong critical acclaim (including album reviews in Goldmine, Alternative Press, and Maximum Rock & Roll), the band followed many of their garage rock brethren into obscurity due to the (at the time) limited appeal of 1960’s retro music. However, as has often been the case with bands of this genre, the Youth gradually acquired a cult status as is evidenced by their reuniting recently for festivals in both the U.S. and Europe.
The band's first albums, "Some Kinda Fun" and "More Gone Gassers" are now highly sought after collector’s items on vinyl.

Band Members By Album

1988-Some Kinda Fun

Derek Dickerson-guitar/lead vocals
Steve Mace-bass guitar/vocals
Chris Fletcher-organ/vocals
F. Clarke Marty-drums/vocals

1990-More Gone Gassers From... The Untamed Youth

Derek Dickerson-Guitars/Sax (on Beach Party)/lead vocals
Steve Mace-bass guitar/vocals
Steve Rager-organ/vocals
F. Clarke Marty-drums/vocals

1992-The Untamed Youth ... Are The Sophisticated International Playboys

Derek Dickerson-Guitars/lead vocals
Steve Mace-bass guitar/vocals
Steve Rager-organ/vocals
Bobby Lloyd Hicks-drums/backing vocals

1994- "The Untamed Youth" - EP
Derek Dickerson-Guitars/lead vocals
Steve Mace-bass guitar/vocals
Doug Walker- organ/vocals
Joel Trueblood- drums

1997- "An Invitation to Planet Mace"
Derek Dickerson- "Guitars/lead vocals"
Steve Mace- "bass guitar/vocals"
Steve Rager- "organ/vocals"
Joel Trueblood- "drums"

Discography
 1988 - Some Kinda Fun - Norton
 1990 - More Gone Gassers from the Untamed Youth - Norton
 1992 - ... Are The Sophisticated International Playboys (Norton Records)
 1995 - Live from Fabulous Las Vegas Strip - Estrus
 1997 - An Invitation to Planet Mace - Estrus
 1998 - Youth Runs Wild - Norton
 2002 - Major Chaos! - Double Crown Records

References

External links
http://www.discogs.com/artist/Untamed+Youth
http://www.trouserpress.com/entry.php?a=untamed_youth

American garage rock groups
Musical groups from Columbia, Missouri